MM730 - Fans Club Welfare Department is a Hong Kong interactive music talk show on ViuTV. Fans are invited to meet their favourite singers, play games and listen songs. It airs at 7:30pm every Tuesday on ViuTV (Ch.99).

2022

2023

References

External links 
 Official Website
 YouTube Playlist (Official Full Version)
2022 in Hong Kong television
2023 in Hong Kong television
Cantonese-language television shows